Dorothy Vaughan (1910–2008) was an American mathematician and human computer.

Dorothy Vaughan may also refer to:
 Dorothy Vaughan (actress) (18901955), American actress
 Dorothy Vaughan (social reformer) (1881–1974), Australian social reformer